Nonlinear Dynamics, An International Journal of Nonlinear Dynamics and Chaos in Engineering Systems is a monthly peer-reviewed scientific journal covering all nonlinear dynamic phenomena associated with mechanical, structural, civil, aeronautical, ocean, electrical, and control systems. It is published by Springer Nature and the editor-in-chief of the journal is Walter Lacarbonara (Sapienza University of Rome).

It should not be confused with the similarly named Russian journal Nelineinaya Dinamika (or the Russian Journal of Nonlinear Dynamics).

Abstracting and indexing 
The journal is abstracted and indexed in:

According to the Journal Citation Reports, the journal has a 2021 impact factor of 5.741.

References

External links
 

English-language journals
Engineering journals
Chaos theory
Publications with year of establishment missing